Miki Yazo (born 1 January 1991), also Mekonenet Yazao or Makonant Vazao, is an Israeli footballer who plays for Maccabi Bnei Reineh F.C.

Sports career
Yazo played football as a youth in Tiberias for local club Beitar Tiberias, which became Ironi Tiberias in 2006, and was purchased by Ironi Kiryat Shmona, where he made his senior debut on 12 May 2015. Yazo was loaned to Hapoel Migdal HaEmek and Ironi Tiberias over the next two seasons, and was transferred to Hapoel Haifa in summer 2015.

See also
Sports in Israel

References

External links
 

1991 births
Living people
Israeli footballers
Israeli Jews
Hapoel Ironi Kiryat Shmona F.C. players
Hapoel Migdal HaEmek F.C. players
Ironi Tiberias F.C. players
Hapoel Haifa F.C. players
Maccabi Ahi Nazareth F.C. players
Hapoel Kfar Saba F.C. players
Hapoel Acre F.C. players
Shimshon Kafr Qasim F.C. players
Maccabi Bnei Reineh F.C. players
Israeli Premier League players
Liga Leumit players
Israeli people of Ethiopian-Jewish descent
Sportspeople of Ethiopian descent
Footballers from Tiberias
Association football defenders